Peter Wesley Wooley (December 26, 1934 – November 15, 2017) was an American film producer, author, director, and production designer with 85 films and television series to his credit, including the Mel Brooks' films Blazing Saddles and High Anxiety. He was nominated for an Emmy Award for Production Design of the movie The Day After.

Wooley was born in East Liverpool, Ohio, and entered the navy immediately upon graduating from high school.  He studied architecture at Kent State.

He married Linda Lane, a singer who studied at the Pasadena Playhouse and performed at the Copacabana, and they had two children, Stephanie Wilson and musician Christopher Wooley.

Wooley began a career in architecture.  He went to work in the movie industry in 1966 as a draftsman on the boards at Warner Brothers.  He worked as a Set Designer at Warner Brothers and Universal Pictures.  Wooley worked as an Assistant Art Director on several television series including Mod Squad. His first series as an Art Director was on the  series My World and Welcome to It.  Several television series followed and then a move into feature films.  Wooley began a long-lasting working relationship with Mel Brooks and was the Production designer on Blazing Saddles and High Anxiety as well as the Brooks-produced film Fatso.

He was the author of the book What! And Give Up Show Business? and  a novel called You Only Go 'Round Once.

Filmography

Going Home 1971
Sounder 1972
The Thief Who Came To Dinner 1972
Cleopatra Jones 1973
Blazing Saddles 1974
Young Frankenstein 1974
Sparkle 1976
High Anxiety 1977
Olly, Olly, Oxen Free 1978
Fatso 1980
Up the Academy 1980
Second Hand Hearts 1981
Under the Rainbow 1981
Jekyll and Hyde...Together Again 1982
The Day After 1983
Hard to Hold 1984
Oh God, You Devil 1984
Porky's Revenge 1985
Summer Rental 1985
Six Against the Rock 1987
The Neon Empire 1989
Donor 1990
Pure Luck 1991
Lakota Moon 1992
Hart to Hart 1994-95
Hidden in Silence 1996
One Man's Hero 1999
A Mother's Testimony 2001
Face Value 2002
National Lampoon's Pucked 2006
Least Among Saints 2012

References

External links
 http://www.wooleypeterwooley.com
 

American production designers
2017 deaths
1934 births